Charles A. Duelfer is Chairman of Omnis, Inc., a consulting firm in aerospace, defense, intelligence, training, and finance. He is a regular commentator in the media on intelligence and foreign policy and is the author of Hide and Seek: The Search for Truth in Iraq.

Duelfer was the former Special Advisor to the Director of Central Intelligence on Iraqi weapons of mass destruction. He led the Iraq Survey Group (ISG) that conducted the investigation of the scope of Iraq's WMD. The ISG was an intelligence organization of over 1700 military and civilian staff that investigated Iraq WMD programs. The ISG's definitive work, known as the Duelfer Report, described in detail the relationship of the Saddam Regime to WMD and was presented to the President and Congress in October 2004. It was published with previously classified addenda in 2005.

From 2005-2008, Duelfer was CEO of Transformational Space, Inc., a small space launch vehicle company that worked under NASA and DARPA contracts to develop a new vapor-pressurized liquid fuel engine.

Previously, Duelfer was the Deputy Executive Chairman and then Acting Chairman of the UN Special Commission on Iraq (UNSCOM) from 1993 until its termination in 2000. The Commission was established following the Gulf War by the UN Security Council to monitor and eliminate Iraq's WMD.

Before joining UNSCOM, Duelfer was Deputy Assistant Secretary of State for arms control and multilateral defense matters. From 1990 to 1992, he was in charge of defense trade matters as the director of the Center for Defense Trade and Deputy to the Assistant Secretary of State for politico-military affairs. In this capacity,  he had responsibility for arms transfers, munitions licensing, and conventional arms control. From January to March 1991, he directed the State Department's Task Force in support of Operation Desert Storm.

Duelfer's 25 years of government service involved policy and intelligence in the Middle East, Africa, Central America, and Asia, and in the areas of nuclear weapons and space programs. Duelfer joined the Politico-Military Bureau of the State Department in 1983 and was responsible for special regional activities including conflicts in Chad, Libya, and Grenada as well as ongoing strategic verification, space, and strategic defense issues. In 1984, he became Deputy Director of the Office of International Security Policy and was responsible for European, Africa, and Latin America regions. He became Director, with responsibility for regional security issues worldwide, in 1985. During this period, Duelfer also worked with the special coordinator for counterterrorism to develop, implement, and exercise the State Department's terrorism response system. Before joining the Department of State, Duelfer worked at the White House Office of Management and Budget (1977-1983), where he was responsible for Department of Defense strategic nuclear forces and space programs.

Duelfer holds a BA from the University of Connecticut and a MSc from the Massachusetts Institute of Technology.

Publications

References

External links
 The Duelfer Report
 www.charlesduelfer.com
 Omnis Senior Management

People of the Iraq War
People of the Central Intelligence Agency
American officials of the United Nations
Living people
Year of birth missing (living people)
University of Connecticut alumni
Massachusetts Institute of Technology alumni